The 2005 Speedway World Cup Qualification (SWC) was a two events of motorcycle speedway meetings used to determine the two national teams who qualify for the 2005 Speedway World Cup. According to the FIM rules the top six nations (Sweden, Great Britain, Denmark, Poland, Australia and Czech Republic) from the 2004 Speedway World Cup were automatically qualified.

Results

Heat details

Daugavpils (1) 
Qualifying round 1
 5 June 2005
  Daugavpils, Latvijas Spidveja Centrs
 Referee: ?

Terenzano (2) 
Qualifying round 2
 4 June 2005
  Terenzano
 Referee: ?
 Only 15 heats

References

See also 
 2005 Speedway World Cup

Q